Ferd Napfel is an American gasser drag racer who won three NHRA national F/Gas (F/G) titles..

History 
Driving a Chevrolet-powered 1955 Chevrolet gasser, Napfel won three NHRA national F/Gas (F/G) titles.

Napfel also won the Street Eliminator crown at Indy that year.

Notes

Sources
Davis, Larry. Gasser Wars, North Branch, MN:  Cartech, 2003, pp.184-5. 

Dragster drivers
American racing drivers